Slipher is a lunar impact crater, that is located in the northern latitudes on the far side of the Moon. The crater overlies the southwestern outer rim of the much larger walled plain D'Alembert, and it occupies a portion of the interior floor of D'Alembert. To the south-southeast is the crater Langevin.

Because it overlies D'Alembert, Slipher is a younger formation and it has undergone much less erosion. The rim is circular but has a somewhat irregular edge. The rim is jumbled and irregular where it intersects D'Alembert. Overlapping the western rim and inner walls of Slipher is the smaller Slipher S, a fresh feature with a sharp-edged outer rim. The interior floor of Slipher is somewhat uneven except in the northeast, and there is a cluster of low central ridges near the midpoint.

Satellite craters 

By convention these features are identified on lunar maps by placing the letter on the side of the crater midpoint that is closest to Slipher.

See also 
 1766 Slipher, main-belt asteroid

References 

 
 
 
 
 
 
 
 
 
 
 
 

Impact craters on the Moon